Pangody is an urban locality (an urban-type settlement) in Nadymsky District of Yamalo-Nenets Autonomous Okrug, Russia. Population:

References

Urban-type settlements in Yamalo-Nenets Autonomous Okrug